Polyclinum aurantium is a species of colonial sea squirt, a tunicate in the family Polyclinidae. It is native to shallow water in the northeastern Atlantic Ocean and Mediterranean Sea.

Description
Polyclinum aurantium forms globular or flat-topped mounds consisting of a number of zooids immersed in a common tunic. Each zooid has its own buccal siphon with six lobes, through which it draws in water, and the colony has a small number of common cloacal siphons, each with a long tongue-like projection, through which water is expelled.

Distribution and habitat
Polyclinum aurantium is native to the northeastern Atlantic Ocean. Its range extends from Norway southwards to the Mediterranean Sea.

References

Enterogona
Animals described in 1841